Joseph Willcox Jenkins (15 February 1928 – 31 January 2014) was an American composer, professor of music, and musician. During his military service in the Korean War, he became the first arranger for the United States Army Chorus. He ended his teaching career as Professor Emeritus at the Mary Pappert School of Music, Duquesne University, where he had been a professor since 1961, and composed over 200 works.

Early life and military service 
By the age of six, Jenkins had already begun piano lessons; soon afterward, he started composing small pieces in elementary school. In high school, he wrote numerous arrangements as well as some original works for orchestra. In 1946, Jenkins began his tertiary studies at Saint Joseph's University (then St. Joseph's College) in Philadelphia, where he focused on pre-law with the ambition of becoming a lawyer. At the same time, he studied composition and counterpoint with Vincent Persichetti at the Philadelphia Conservatory (which became part of the University of the Arts in 1962). Jenkins completed his degree at St. Joseph's in three years and enrolled in the Eastman School of Music in 1949. While there, he studied under important composers including Thomas Canning, Howard Barlow, Bernard Rogers, and Howard Hanson. Jenkins graduated from Eastman with a Masters of Music in 1951, in the middle of the Korean War. He was subsequently drafted into the Army and assigned to serve at Fort George G. Meade, in Maryland.

During his military service, Jenkins was the arranger for The United States Army Field Band as well as for the Armed Forces Radio Network. While with the Army Field Band, he composed his now famous American Overture for Band, Op. 13. A 50th anniversary version of American Overture for Band was published by Theodore Presser Company in 2004, with collaboration between Jenkins and the publisher. The original score was updated to include revisions to the work's dynamics, articulations and pitches. American Overture became Jenkins' most successful work and he stated he would be "hard-pressed to duplicate its success."

Teaching career and reenlistment 
In 1953, Jenkins held an interim teaching position at Catholic University, replacing a professor on sabbatical. He was so impressed by the faculty and courses at Catholic that he decided to take advantage of G.I. Bill funding and complete his doctorate there, studying under William L. Graves and other scholars. While there, Jenkins also studied under Conrad Bernier, who Jenkins would later list in an autobiographical book chapter under individuals who were especially influential in his development and career.

In 1956, Jenkins reenlisted in the military to become chief arranger and assistant conductor of the United States Army Chorus, formed that same year, becoming the institution's first arranger. Established as the vocal counterpart to the Army Band, the Army Chorus is a premier male vocal ensemble. Jenkins wrote over 270 arrangements for voice while with the Army Chorus, in addition to several original works. Jenkins is known for his vocal arrangements of well-known Stephen Foster works, such as "Beautiful Dreamer," "Camptown Races," "Oh! Susanna," and "Some Folks," which he wrote for the Army Chorus and remain part of its core repertoire, along with many of his other arrangements.

Jenkins began his position as a tenured Professor of Theory and Composition at the Mary Pappert School of Music, Duquesne University in 1961. At Duquesne, he taught music  theory, orchestration and composition and "was beloved by his students, colleagues and fellow musicians." During his term at Duquesne, Jenkins served as Head of the Theory and Composition Department in the university's School of Music.

Much of his collected choral works are available as part of Gumberg Library's Music Library Resources, alongside those of jazz guitarist and educator Joe "Handyman" Negri, another music educator who also influenced youth (in Mister Rogers' Neighborhood) and mature minds as a professor at Duquesne. LTC John Clanton, former director of the U.S. Army Orchestra and U.S. Army Chorus, stated that Jenkins is "one of only a handful of composers and arrangers in the entire world who truly understands the musical potential of the male chorus".

In addition to his university teaching, Jenkins influenced students at the primary and secondary school levels as the organist and instrumental music teacher (orchestra director) at St. Edmund's Academy, and by composing works for the orchestra at The Ellis School, both in Pittsburgh, Pennsylvania. He composed works for other elementary and secondary schools, including the Holy Innocents High School of Pittsburgh and the Marlborough School of Los Angeles. Apart from his influence in classrooms, Jenkins participated as organist and choirmaster at Sewickley Presbyterian Church in Sewickley, Pennsylvania, at St. Bernard Catholic Church in Mt. Lebanon, Pennsylvania, and at Rodef Shalom Congregation in Pittsburgh.

Selected awards 
 Ford Foundation fellowship (administered by the National Music Council) to serve as composer-in-residence Evanston Township High School, Illinois, 1959
 Sousa/Ostwald Award: Cumberland Gap Overture, 1961
 ASCAP: thirty awards, one every year, 1960-1990
 Omicron Delta Kappa Teacher of the Year Award, 2000
 American Bandmasters Association Award,

Musical works

For orchestra 
 1973 Sinfonia de la Frontera
 two symphonies
 1997 "American Overture" (transcribed for orchestra from band piece by D. Wilson Ochoa)

For concert band and brass band 
 1955 An American Overture, op. 13
 1959 Charles County Overture
 1961 Cumberland Gap
 1969 Cuernavaca
 1975 Symphonic Jubilee
 1977 In Traskwood Country
 1978 Tartan Suite
 1978 Toccata, op. 104
 1954 Pieces Of Eight
 1995 Credimus
 Arioso
 Cannonade (Concert March)
 Concerto for euphonium and band
 Gateway West
 Prelude
 Romanza
 Hoedown
 Purcell Portraits
 Three Images

Masses, cantatas and sacred music 
 1999 Psalm 100, for mixed choir, op. 191
 1999 Ave Maria (Hommage a Josquin), chamber choir, op. 192
 2001 Requiem, for mixed choir and orchestra, op. 198
 Joy to the World, for mixed choir, 3 trumpets, 3 trombones, 2 horns, timpani and organ 
 Cantate Hodie (Sing Forth This Day), cantata for soprano, mixed choir, brass and organ, op. 197
 Good Christian men, rejoice
 In dulci jubilo
 The Rocking Carol
 Bring your torches
 A la nanita nana
 I saw three ships
 O little town of Bethlehem
 Kolyada

For choir 
 1997 Six Carols for Westerly, for mixed choir, op. 183
 1997 Six American Folk Tunes, for mixed choir and brass band, op. 185
 1997 Etz Chayim, for mixed choir, op. 186
 1999 Vitis Mysticum, for mixed choir and orchestra, op. 193
 Hail Thee, Festival Day, based on Salve festa dies, for mixed choir, 2 trumpets, 2 trombones, timpani and organ
 Heartland, for children's choir and brass band 
 Dan Tucker
 Crockett County
 I Shall Not Live in Vain – text: Emily Dickinson
 Street Parade
 An Indian Summer on the Prairie – text: Vachel Lindsay
 The Prairie – text: William Cullen Bryant

Vocal 
 1959 The Minstrel Boy, for tenor solo, male quartet and choir – text: Thomas Moore
 1966 Czech Lullaby Carol, for voice, winds, strings and piano

Chamber 
 Sonata No. 1 (in One Movement) in D minor for viola and piano, Op. 7 (1950)
 two string quartets

For organ 
 1951 Toccata
 1966 Six Pieces for Organ
 Upon an Old English Hymn Tune
 Arioso
 Sonata
 Adagio in Phrygian Modes
 Rondeau
 Deo Gracias
 1968 Fancy and Ayre
 1999 Confluence
 Thin Small Voice, a biblical symphonic poem

For percussion 
 Bits and Pieces, for Timpani and Piano

References

External links 
 , 26 March 2011
  on piano, following a concert titled "A Tribute to Joseph Willcox Jenkins" presented by The United States Army Chorus on 14 July 2007
 , Composed by Joseph Willcox Jenkins - July, 1950. op. 5

20th-century classical composers
American male classical composers
American classical composers
1928 births
2014 deaths
Musicians from Pittsburgh
Pupils of Bernard Rogers
United States Army Band musicians
20th-century American composers
Classical musicians from Pennsylvania
20th-century American male musicians